Scott McKechnie (born 6 August 1991) is an English-born cricketer who plays for the Hong Kong cricket team. 

He made his One Day International (ODI) debut for Hong Kong against Papua New Guinea in the 2015–17 ICC World Cricket League Championship on 6 December 2017. In August 2018, he was named in Hong Kong's squad for the 2018 Asia Cup Qualifier tournament. Hong Kong won the qualifier tournament, and he was then named in Hong Kong's squad for the 2018 Asia Cup.

In April 2019, he was named in Hong Kong's squad for the 2019 ICC World Cricket League Division Two tournament in Namibia. In September 2019, he was named in Hong Kong's Twenty20 International (T20I) squad for the 2019–20 Oman Pentangular Series, and the 2019 ICC T20 World Cup Qualifier tournament in the United Arab Emirates. He made his T20I debut for Hong Kong, against Oman, on 5 October 2019.

On 8 March 2020, McKechnie announced his retirement from international cricket. However, in July 2022, he was named in Hong Kong's squad for the 2022 ICC Men's T20 World Cup Global Qualifier B tournament in Zimbabwe.

References

External links
 

1991 births
Living people
English cricketers
Hong Kong cricketers
Hong Kong One Day International cricketers
Hong Kong Twenty20 International cricketers
Cricketers from Salford